The Count of Rennes was originally the ruler of the Romano-Frankish civitas of Rennes. From the middle of the ninth century these counts were Bretons with close ties to the Duchy of Brittany, which they often vied to rule. From 990 the Counts of Rennes were usually Dukes of Brittany. In 1203 the county was integrated into the ducal demesne. The Count of Rennes was a title held by the House of Rennes.

???–876 Gurwant, also Duke from 874
876–888 Judicael
888–896 Berengar II of Neustria
896–903 unknown
903–953 Judicael Berengar
958–992 Conan I the Crooked, also Duke from 990
992–1008 Geoffrey I, also Duke
1008–1040 Alan I, also Duke; granted the Countship of Penthievre to his brother Eudes, thereby founding the Cadet Branch of the House of Rennes.  Ruled with Odo, Count of Penthièvre until 1035.
1040–1066 Conan II, also Duke
1066–1082 Geoffrey II Grenonat
1066–1072 Hawise (in opposition to Geoffrey II), also Duchess
1072–1084 Hoel I (in opposition to Geoffrey II from 1066), also Duke from 1066
1084–1112 Alan II Fergant, also Duke
1112–1148 Conan III the Fat, also Duke
1148–1156 Hoel II
1156–1166 Conan IV the Young, also Duke until 1166
1166–1181 Henry Curtmantle, as guardian of Constance
1181–1186 Geoffrey III, Count of Rennes and Duke of Brittany jure uxoris as Geoffrey II
1166–1201 Constance, also Duchess from 1166
1196–1203 Arthur, also Duke

The County of Rennes was merged permanently into the Ducal crown of Brittany, and subsequently the crown of France, through Constance's descendants.

Sources
Comté de Rennes

Rennes